Aleksandar Todorovski (born 26 February 1984) is a Serbian-born Macedonian professional footballer who plays as a defender in Serbia for Grafičar Beograd.

Club career
Todorovski started out at Radnički Beograd in 2002. He made 10 appearances in the 2004–05 First League of Serbia and Montenegro. In 2005, Todorovski moved abroad to Cyprus and joined APOEL. He also played for Digenis Akritas and AEL Limassol, before returning to Serbia in 2008.

After spending three seasons at Rad, Todorovski moved abroad for the second time and signed with Polish club Polonia Warsaw in 2011. He was acquired by Austrian side Sturm Graz in June 2013. In early 2015, Todorovski returned to Poland and joined Zagłębie Lubin.

In June 2018, Todorovski returned to Serbia and joined Radnički Niš. Todorovski extended his contract with Radnički Niš in June 2019.

International career
In 2002, Todorovski represented FR Yugoslavia at under-19 level. He, however, accepted a call-up to represent Macedonia in early 2010. During his five-year international career, between 2010 and 2015, Todorovski was capped 16 times for the Macedonia national team. His final international was a June 2015 European Championship qualification match away against Slovakia.

References

Notes

External links
 
 
 
 
 
 

1984 births
Living people
Sportspeople from Kraljevo
Serbian people of Macedonian descent
Association football defenders
Serbia and Montenegro footballers
Serbian footballers
Macedonian footballers
North Macedonia international footballers
FK Radnički Beograd players
APOEL FC players
Digenis Akritas Morphou FC players
AEL Limassol players
FK Rad players
Polonia Warsaw players
SK Sturm Graz players
Zagłębie Lubin players
FK Radnički Niš players
First League of Serbia and Montenegro players
Cypriot First Division players
Serbian SuperLiga players
Ekstraklasa players
Austrian Football Bundesliga players
Serbia and Montenegro expatriate footballers
Serbian expatriate footballers
Macedonian expatriate footballers
Expatriate footballers in Cyprus
Serbian expatriate sportspeople in Cyprus
Serbia and Montenegro expatriate sportspeople in Cyprus
Macedonian expatriate sportspeople in Cyprus
Expatriate footballers in Poland
Serbian expatriate sportspeople in Poland
Macedonian expatriate sportspeople in Poland
Expatriate footballers in Austria
Serbian expatriate sportspeople in Austria
Macedonian expatriate sportspeople in Austria